Zeiller & Fournier was a short-lived French automobile producer.

Car production began in 1920 at premises in Levallois-Perret, and ended in 1924.   The cars were designed by racing driver Charles Fournier.   There is no connection established between Charles Fournier and the Fournier brothers who established an automobile manufacturing business under the name Établissements Fournier in the same part of north-central Paris.

Less than a year after the outbreak of peace, Zeiller et Fournier took a stand at the 15th Paris Motor Show and exhibited 1 6/8HP car which sat on a  wheelbase and was powered by a Ballot 4-cylinder engine of 1131cc.   The car featured an interesting 5-speed friction transmission and a chain final drive.   There was also a smaller car produced with a 904cc 4-cylinder engine from Ruby.

Reading list 
 Harald Linz, Halwart Schrader: Die Internationale Automobil-Enzyklopädie. United Soft Media Verlag, München 2008, . (German)
 George Nick Georgano (Chefredakteur): The Beaulieu Encyclopedia of the Automobile. Volume 3: P–Z. Fitzroy Dearborn Publishers, Chicago 2001, . (English)
 George Nick Georgano: Autos. Encyclopédie complète. 1885 à nos jours. Courtille, Paris 1975. (French)

Sources and notes 

Defunct motor vehicle manufacturers of France
Vehicle manufacturing companies established in 1920
French companies established in 1920
Vehicle manufacturing companies disestablished in 1924
1924 disestablishments in France